Robyn Michelle Toomey-Matthews (born 6 March 1964 in Napier) is a former field hockey player from New Zealand, who finished in eight position with the National Women's Field Hockey Team, nicknamed The Black Sticks, at the 1992 Summer Olympics in Barcelona. She was also a member of the squad that won the bronze medal at the 1998 Commonwealth Games in Kuala Lumpur.

References

External links
 

New Zealand female field hockey players
Olympic field hockey players of New Zealand
Field hockey players at the 1992 Summer Olympics
1964 births
Living people
Sportspeople from Napier, New Zealand
Commonwealth Games bronze medallists for New Zealand
Field hockey players at the 1998 Commonwealth Games
Commonwealth Games medallists in field hockey
Medallists at the 1998 Commonwealth Games